Dr. Jagdish Gandhi (born 10 November 1936) is an Indian politician and Educationist who founded the City Montessori School with his wife Bharti Gandhi. He had served as a member of the Uttar Pradesh Legislative Assembly from the Sikandra Rao constituency from 1969 to 1974 independently.

Early life and education 
Gandhi was born to Phool Chand Agarwal and Bansmati Devi on November 10, 1936 in Barsauli Village, Sikandra Rao, Aligarh, Uttar Pradesh. He did Matriculation from G. S. College, Aligarh and Intermediate from Champa Agarwal College, Mathura. He did Bachelor of Commerce from Lucknow University.

References 

Living people
1936 births
Uttar Pradesh MLAs 1969–1974
People from Hathras district
Educationists from India
Independent politicians in India
Founders of Indian schools and colleges